John Dodds may refer to:

John Dodds (motorcyclist), Australian motorcycle racer
John Dodds (footballer), Scottish footballer
John M. Dodds, Scottish electrical engineer
Sir John Stokell Dodds, Australian politician and Chief Justice of Tasmania
Johnny Dodds, American jazz musician

See also
John Dodd (disambiguation)
John Dods, special effects make-up artist